Shimul Javeri Kadri is an Indian architect who is the founder of SJK Architects, an architectural firm in the city of Mumbai, India. 

It has won multiple international & national awards including the Prix Versailles Award (2016)  and the World Architecture Festival Award (2012). It has also been named one of Architectural Digest's Top 100 (AD 100) and Top 50 (AD50) that features the most influential architects and interior designers in India. Kadri has a philosophy of building in harmony with nature— using natural elements, sunlight, wind, natural materials, and cultural contexts. 

Her projects include museums, hotels, office and industrial buildings, educational institutions, and bungalows.

Biography
Kadri studied architecture in Mumbai at the Academy of Architecture, and Urban Planning at the University of Michigan Ann Arbor. She set up SJK Architects after she returned to India from the US in 1990. 

Award-winning buildings she has designed include the Automobile Design Studio for Mahindra and Mahindra Limited, India, which won the Chicago Athenaeum Museum of Architecture and Design Award 2016. The design of the Dasavatara Hotel in Tirupati, India won the Prix Versailles Special Prize in 2016, while the design of the Lotus Cafe in the same hotel won the Prix Versailles in the Restaurants category.  The design and architecture of the Nirvana Films office, Bengaluru, has won multiple awards including the World Architecture Festival Small Project of the Year Award 2012, the Excellence in Design Award, and the FuturArc Green Leadership Award.

Other significant projects include the Synergy Lifestyles factory in Karur, Sparkrill International School and SR Engineering College in Warangal and Ayushakti, an ayurvedic health resort in Mumbai. The challenge was to build this ayurvedic resort in a crowded Mumbai suburb within a narrow 16 m wide plot bounded on three sides by residential buildings, yet infuse it with light, air, space, joy and peace. 

Shimul serves as a trustee for Akshara, a women's resource centre in Mumbai a for Save the Children India where she has been actively steering education and women's projects.

References

External links
 

Living people
1953 births
Indian women architects
20th-century Indian architects
Artists from Mumbai
20th-century Indian women artists
Women artists from Maharashtra
Qadiri order